The US Post Office-Quincy Main is a historic post office at 47 Washington Street in Quincy, Massachusetts.  It is a Classical Revival structure, two stories tall, built in 1909 out of limestone.  It has corner pilasters, and a central entry section that projects slightly, also with articulating pilasters, and three recessed entryways.  The building was originally built to house a variety of federal government offices, as well as providing the first purpose-built home for Quincy's main post office.

The building was listed on the National Register of Historic Places in 1986.

See also 

National Register of Historic Places listings in Quincy, Massachusetts
List of United States post offices

References 

Government buildings completed in 1909
Quincy
Neoclassical architecture in Massachusetts
Buildings and structures in Quincy, Massachusetts
National Register of Historic Places in Quincy, Massachusetts